The Theodore Carpenter House, in Mount Kisco, Westchester County, New York, is a post-American Civil War home built by Theodore Carpenter, a prominent Mount Kisco official. The house was used as the main setting in the filming of the movie Ragtime.</ref>

The house also served as the inspiration for Samantha Parkington's house in the American Girl book series.

References

Houses in Westchester County, New York